Joseph Irwin may refer to:

 Joseph C. Irwin (1904–1987), American politician from New Jersey
 Joseph Oscar Irwin (1898–1982), British statistician
 Joseph Denis Irwin (born 1965), Irish footballer